Wesley O'Brien (born 5 August 1948) is an Australian wrestler. He competed in two events at the 1968 Summer Olympics.

References

External links
 

1948 births
Living people
Australian male sport wrestlers
Olympic wrestlers of Australia
Wrestlers at the 1968 Summer Olympics
Sportspeople from Melbourne
People from Sunshine, Victoria
Sportsmen from Victoria (Australia)